Waverley Route Heritage Association is a heritage railway group involved with the history, heritage and preservation of the Waverley Route, based/centred on Whitrope, south of Hawick, Scotland.

Current projects include the restoration of the 1,208 yard Whitrope Tunnel, formerly part of the Border Union Railway. Also under restoration is Whitrope Siding, which is the headquarters of the line and the home of WRHA's Whitrope Heritage Centre.

The Association operates a train service along a mile of former Waverley Route track from Whitrope Tunnel to Bridge 200. The association's other aims include restoring most of the track south of Whitrope to Riccarton Junction. The WRHA have been negotiating a new lease with the Forestry Commission.

Border Union Railway Company 

The Border Union Railway Company is a wholly owned subsidiary of the WRHA, which runs trains on a section of demonstration track north and south from Whitrope Heritage Centre.

Motive power 
Diesel locomotives and railcar

Rolling stock 
Passenger coaches

Goods wagons

Borders Railway 
The northern part of the Waverley Route has been re-opened as the Borders Railway which is part of the National Rail network.

References

External links 
 Waverley Route Heritage Association
 Video footage of the tunnel approach and Whitrope Siding station

Heritage railways in Scotland